Julia Matijass (born 22 September 1973 in Lyubino, Soviet Union) is a German judoka. She was a member of the Russian national judo team until 1994, and received a German citizenship in 1999.

She won a bronze medal in the extra-lightweight (-48 kg) division at the 2004 Summer Olympics.

External links
 
 
 

1973 births
Living people
German female judoka
Judoka at the 2004 Summer Olympics
Olympic judoka of Germany
Olympic bronze medalists for Germany
Russian emigrants to Germany
Olympic medalists in judo
Medalists at the 2004 Summer Olympics
21st-century German women